Liberté is the fifteenth studio album by American rock band the Doobie Brothers, released on Island Records. First released exclusively on streaming services on October 1, 2021, the album saw a CD release on October 29 of that month and an LP release in June 2022. It is their first studio album since 2014's Southbound, and their first of new material since 2010's World Gone Crazy. The band toured following the release of the album.

Background

Vocalist and keyboardist Michael McDonald does not appear on the album, despite being a member of the band during its recording and release. Instead, the album features the lineup of vocalist and guitarist Tom Johnston, vocalist and guitarist Patrick Simmons, and guitarist John McFee. All tracks on the album were co-written by John Shanks, who also produced the album. The album was promoted with the August release of a self-titled, four track EP featuring the tracks "Oh Mexico", "Cannonball", "Don't Ya Mess with Me", and "Better Days", and with a lyric video for the track "Shine Your Light", posted to the band's official YouTube channel on the day of the album's release.

Reception

Upon its release, Libertè failed to chart on the Billboard 200, one of only three of their albums to have that distinction, along with their 1971 self-titled debut, and 2000's Sibling Rivalry. However, it did manage to chart at number 47 on the Billboard Top Album Sales chart. "Easy", the first and only single released from the album, reached number 16 on the Billboard Adult Contemporary chart.

The album received moderately positive reviews from music critics. AllMusic's Stephen Thomas Erlewine awarded it three stars, noting that while the band "take[s] pains to make the album sound contemporary" with a "glossy" production style and electronic elements, "the record works because the Doobies remain dedicated to the rocking boogie they've been playing for 50 years."

Track listing

Personnel

Tom Johnston – lead vocals (tracks 1, 3, 6, 7, 9, 10, 12), acoustic guitar (track 1), electric guitar (tracks 1, 3, 10), guitar (tracks 6, 7, 9), backing vocals (tracks 1, 3, 4, 7–12)
Patrick Simmons – lead vocals (tracks 2, 4, 5, 8, 11), acoustic guitar (track 8), guitar (track 4, 11), guitjo and banjo (track 11), backing vocals (tracks 2, 4, 5, 8)
John McFee – vocals (track 7), electric guitar (track 4), guitar (track 11), mandolin and banjo (track 6), pedal steel guitar (track 9), backing vocals (tracks 4, 6, 9, 11)

Additional musicians

John Shanks – electric and acoustic guitar (all tracks), bass guitar (tracks 1, 3, 5, 7, 8), dobro (track 4), keyboards (tracks 2, 4–10, 12), synthesizer (track 3), piano (tracks 3, 4), organ (track 9), programming (tracks 1–4, 6, 7, 9, 11), drum programming (track 10), percussion (track 7), backing vocals (tracks 2, 4–10, 12), production (all tracks)
Billy Payne – piano (tracks 2, 4–7, 9, 11, 12), Hammond B-3 organ (tracks 2, 4–7, 9, 10–12), Wurlitzer organ (tracks 4, 9), keyboards (tracks 5, 10, 12), synthesizer (track 2)
John Cowan – backing vocals (tracks 1–7, 9–12)
Victor Indrizzo – drums (all tracks), percussion (tracks 1–5, 7, 8, 10–12)
Bob Glaub – bass guitar (tracks 4, 6, 9–12)
Jeff Babko – piano and synthesizer (track 3) Hammond B3 and Wurlitzer organ (tracks 1 and 3), clavinet (track 1)
Bradley Giroux – drum programming (track 8)
Lucy Woodward – backing vocals (track 12)
Dan Keen – string arrangements (track 12)
Production

 Jeri Heiden, Ryan Corey – art direction, design
 Shari Sutcliffe – music contractor, project coordinator
 Bradley Giroux, Keith Gretlein – engineer (tracks 2, 4, 6, 7, 9, 11)
 Jeremiah Rios – assistant engineer at Studio At The Palms (tracks 2)
 Joe LaPorta – mastering
 Chris Lord-Alge – mixing (tracks 1–5, 8, 10, 12)
 Michael H. Brauer – mixing (tracks 6, 7, 9, 11)
 Brian Judd – assistant mixing (tracks 1–5, 8, 10, 12)
 Fernando Reyes – assistant mixing (tracks 6, 7, 9, 11)
 Clay Patrick McBride – photography
 Dan Chase – additional recording and editing (tracks 4, 6, 7, 9, 11)
 Tom Syrowski – additional recording and editing (tracks 2, 5, 10, 12)
 Steve Marcantonio – John Cowan vocals recording (tracks 1, 3)

Note

  The credits for Liberté, in some cases, list credits for "guitar" contributions. This is in addition to already listed acoustic and electric guitar credits, and it is unclear what these credits are specifically meant to refer to.

Charts

References

The Doobie Brothers albums
2021 albums
Albums produced by John Shanks
Island Records albums